The Akisho (Somali: Akiisho, Arabic: أكيشو) is a sub-division of the Dir subclan of the clan family.

Overview

As a Dir sub-clan, the Akisho have immediate lineal ties with the Issa, the Gadabuursi, the Surre (Abdalle and Qubeys), the Biimaal (who the Gaadsen also belong too), the Bajimal, the Bursuk, the Gurgura, (the Quranyow sub-clan to be precise as they claim descent from Dir), Gariire, other Dir sub-clans and they have lineal ties with the Hawiye (Irir), Hawadle, Ajuraan, Degoodi, Gaalje'el clan groups, who share the same ancestor Samaale.

Distribution

The Akisho inhabit both the Somaliland and Ethiopia in Somali region. In Somaliland, Akisho members live in the Maroodi Jeex region, in the cities and towns of Hargeisa, Arabsiyo, Wajaale, Allaybaday, and Gabiley In Ethiopia, where the Akisho are among the most widespread Somali group, Akisho members inhabit Jijiga, Qordhere, Dire Dewa, Bale (Nagelle), Babile, Fayanbiro, Qabri-Bayah, Fiq, Hara-Maaya, Harar, Obra, and Dadar. Fadeyga godanta booraale gursum and many more geographical regions. Currently, the sultan of the Akisho clan is Muhiyadiin Odawa.

Also the Madahweyne Dir, Akisho clan is one of the largest Dir sub-clans within the borders of the Somaliland region of Ethiopia based on the Ethiopian population census. Many Akisho's live in the Afar region of Ethiopia.

The Akisho live in Jijiga district where they make up a large part of the Kebri Beyah and Fafan Zone. The Dir-Madaxweyne Akisho, along with the Gurgura, Issa and Gadabuursi subclans of the Dir represent the most native and indigenous Somali tribes in Harar.

History 

Akisho is one of the oldest Somali clans being mentioned as far back as the 16th century in the book The Conquest of Abyssinia also known as Futuh al-habash. Akisho members are strict adherents of Sunni Islam. Akisho groups and their related clans are reputed to have migrated from Somali Ethiopian region all the way up North as far as the country Chad, the Sudan, and Northern Eritrea are said to be inhabited by Akisho and many Dir tribes.  Ahmed Gurey was one of the Akisho members.

The city of Dire Dawa was originally called Dir Dhabe and used to be part of Adal Sultanate during the medieval times and was exclusively settled by Dir clan which is a major Somali tribe. The Akisho name is originally derived from "Cayisho" which means, in old Somali, the (Cayilsan) "Fat One."  The Gurre and Gurgurre both are very closely related to the Akisho, use a nickname and were referred to the Oromo and Somalis as the traders or Gurgure from the old Somali and Oromo word "gorgortan" which means one who sells and trades.

According to the folklore historians of the Southern Suure Dir of the Mudug region, the Akisho and Gurre and the Gurgure Madahweyne Dir produced some of the most famous Somali folk heroes like the Somali queen Araweelo who was Warre Miyo. Also the Akisho and Gurgure clans were instrumental in spreading the Muslim faith in the hinterlands of Ethiopia. The Sheikh Abba Hussein in Southern Ethiopia is said to be of Dir, as well as Awbarkadleh and Awbuube who are two major saints of the Somalis.
Currently Muhiyadiin Odowa is the Sultan of the Akisho. Famous people of the Akisho clan are Ahmed Gurey Arawelo and Oday Biiqay.

The information in contained in this Response was provided by Matt Bryden, a consultant and Somali specialist now working with the United Nations Institute for Research on Social Development (UNRISD) in Nairobi (16 June 1998). He stated that the Akisho "are related to the Dir clan family, and live mainly between Jigjiga [in Ethiopia], Hargeysa and many regions in Ethiopia. In Somalia, they have been awarded a seat in the constituent assembly. They face no threat of persecution in any of the areas in which they live." The Research Directorate was unable to corroborate the Akisho's participation in the constituent assembly nor whether they face "persecution."

According to the Ethiopian Review the Akisho may be more numerous in Ethiopia than they are in Somalia (30 April 1996). For additional information on the Dir clan and the Akisho sub clan, please consult Patrick Gilkes' The Price of Peace: Somalia and the United Nations 1991–1994 pages 144–148, and the appendix of Somali clan families.

Clan tree
The Akisho clan consists of 12 major sub-clans:

Akisho
Miyo 
Reer Warfaa 
Reer Dalal
Reer Robleh
Reer Gadiid
Reer Hawadee
Reer Buuke
Reer Agal
 Reer-Bito
 Reer-Dayo
Reer-Luujo
Reer Geedi
Ali Idoora
Ali Libaan
Ali Ibrahim 
-Reer-Ito 
 Ree Rooble 
 Ree cadaawe
 Ree Tukale
 Ree kibriidle
Kiyo 
 Reer Adeele
 Reer Cadow
 Reer Geele
 Reer Allaale
 Reer Xildiid
Reer-Heebaan (Curad Akisho)
-Reer-Kurto
Obo
 Liban
 Jire
 Reer Biiqe
 Rear Abayu
 Warimani
 Suubo
Igo
 Reer Ismaacil
 Reer Wadhowr
Asaabo
Gurre
Eejo

There is no clear agreement on the clan and sub-clan structures and many lineages are omitted. The following listing is taken from the World Bank's Conflict in Somalia: Drivers and Dynamics from 2005 and the United Kingdom's Home Office publication, Somalia Assessment 2001.

Dir
 Akisho
Issa
 Gadabuursi
 Biimaal "Bimal"
 Surre 
 Quranyow of the Garre "Gorajno"
 Gurgura "Gurgure"
 Garrire "Gerire" 
 Bajimal "Bajumal"
 Barsuug "Bursuk"
Gurre''Goorre''

In the south central part of Somalia the World Bank shows the following clan tree:

Dir
Akisho 
Gadabuursi
Isse
Bimal
Gadsan
Qubeys

Notable figures
Ahmed Gurey
Ref: Futūḥ al-Ḥabasha. (n.d.). Christian-Muslim Relations 1500–1900. doi:10.1163/2451-9537_cmrii_com_26077

Notes

References
 Futūḥ al-Ḥabasha. (n.d.). Christian-Muslim Relations 1500–1900. doi:10.1163/2451-9537_cmrii_com_26077
 Country Information and Policy Unit, Somalia Assessment 2001, Home Office, Great Britain
Bryden, Matt. UNRISD, Nairobi. 16 June 1998. Letter received by electronic mail.
Gilkes, Patrick. September 1994. The Price of Peace: Somalia and the United Nations 1991–1994. Bedfordshire, UK: Save the Children Fund, UK.
Additional Sources Consulted
Africa Confidential [London]. January – May 1998. Vol. 39. Nos. 1–11.
_.  January – December 1997. Vol. 38. Nos. 1–25.
Africa Research Bulletin: Political, Social and Cultural Series [Oxford]. January – May 1998. Vol. 35. Nos. 1–4.
_. January – December 1997. Vol. 34. Nos. 1–11.
Country Reports on Human Rights Practices for 1997. 1998.
Horn of Africa Bulletin [Uppsala]. Vol. 10. Nos. 1–2.
_. January – December 1997. Vol. 9. Nos. 1–10.
The Indian Ocean Newsletter [Paris]. January – June 1998. Nos. 793–815.
_. January – December 1997. Nos. 747 – 792.

Somali clans
Somali clans in Ethiopia